Moogana Sedu is a 1980 Indian Kannada-language film directed by B. Subba Rao and produced by A. L. Abbayi Naidu. The film stars Shankar Nag and Manjula. The film showcased Shankar Nag's acting capabilities through his performance as a dumb man.

Cast
 Shankar Nag as Nagaraja
 Manjula
 Sampath
 Udaykumar
 T. N. Balakrishna
 Sundar Krishna Urs
 Shankar Rao
 Prabhakar
 Advani Lakshmi Devi
 K. V. Jaya

Soundtrack
The music of the film was composed by Satyam with lyrics penned by Chi. Udaya Shankar.

Track list

External links
 
 Moogana Sedu songs

1980 films
1980s Kannada-language films
Films scored by Satyam (composer)